Lac-Pikauba is an unorganized territory in the Capitale-Nationale region of Quebec, Canada. It is a large, unpopulated, undeveloped territory that makes up two-thirds of the Charlevoix Regional County Municipality.

The entire area west of Quebec Route 381, which bisects the territory, is part of the Laurentides Wildlife Reserve and the Grands-Jardins National Park. A portion of the Hautes-Gorges-de-la-Rivière-Malbaie National Park is in the north-eastern part of the territory.

The territory's largest lake is the eponymous Lake Pikauba. This toponym comes from the Montagnais word Opikopau. Opi is a root to indicate that something is enclosed or confined. Kopau describes a lake with alders, reeds, or other. So Pikauba may be translated as "lake narrowed by Alders". The map of provincial surveyor Frederic William Blaiklock from 1852 referred to this lake by the name Chicoutimi Lake.

Demographics
Population:
 Population in 2011: 0
 Population in 2006: 0
 Population in 2001: 0
 Population in 1996: 0
 Population in 1991: 5

References

See also 
 Laurentides Wildlife Reserve
 Rivière du Gouffre, a river
 Savane Lake (Lac-Pikauba), an unorganised territory
 Rivière Savane du Nord, a river
 Sainte-Anne River (Beaupré), a river
 Rivière des Îlets (rivière du Gouffre), a river
 Rivière du Gouffre Sud-Ouest, a river
 Rivière des Monts, a river
 Le Gros Bras (Gouffre River tributary), a river

Unorganized territories in Capitale-Nationale